The GMD SW1200MG is a 4-axle electric locomotive built by General Motors Diesel between 1963 and 1971. The locomotive is the electric version of the diesel powered SW1200, with the prime mover replaced by a motor-generator set, hence the MG suffix in the model number. 

Locomotives run under 2400V 60 Hz, in automatic control without driver. The difference with SW1200 is that a single-phase electric motor is provided in place of the diesel engine, with adapted control.

Nine examples of this locomotive were built for a single Canadian customer – Iron Ore Company of Canada (IOC).

See also 
List of GMD Locomotives

References

External links 
technical leaflet (in french)
IOC

SW1200MG
B-B locomotives
Electric locomotives of Canada
Railway locomotives introduced in 1963
Standard gauge locomotives of Canada

Shunting locomotives